The Sweden Billie Jean King Cup team represents Sweden in the Billie Jean King Cup tennis competition and is governed by the Swedish Tennis Association.

History
Sweden competed in its first Fed Cup in 1964.  Their best result was reaching the quarterfinals on four occasions.

Current team (2017)
Johanna Larsson
Jacqueline Cabaj Awad
Cornelia Lister
Mirjam Björklund

Results

2010–2019

External links

Billie Jean King Cup teams
Fed Cup
Fed Cup